D. W. Jesudoss (born 1939) was the Principal from 1992 through 2001 at the Gurukul Lutheran Theological College, Chennai, affiliated to the nation's first University, the Senate of Serampore College (University).

Studies

Graduate
Jesudoss graduated from the Gurukul Lutheran Theological College, Madras in 1965 earning a Bachelor of Divinity degree conferred by the Senate of Serampore College (University).

Postgraduate
Jesudoss enrolled for a postgraduate degree at the United Theological College, Bangalore from 1970-1971, affiliated to the nation's first University, the Senate of Serampore College (University), under the Principalship of Joshua Russell Chandran, studying together with R. Yesurathnam, where he obtained a Master of Theology and working out a dissertation entitled A study of Luther's concept of the bondage of the will and its relevance for the interpretation of man in India today and later awarded a degree by the University under the Registrarship of Chetti Devasahayam.

Doctoral
For further research studies, Jesudoss went to the University of Erlangen where he submitted a dissertation in 1986 entitled What is man?: theological attempts and directions towards the formation of an Indian Christian anthropology for today

Writings
 1984, Das Menschenbild in der Bhagavadgita und der Bibel (in German),
 1985, Stärke und Nutzen der Kultur (in German),
 1986, What is man?: theological attempts and directions towards the formation of an Indian Christian anthropology for today,
 1987, Towards a bold theological vision: souvenir released on the occasion of the diamond jubilee celebrations,
 1987, Reflections on the Paper Presented by Dr. Daniel Chetti on ‘Luther’s Doctrine of the Church’,
 1988, Luther’s Concept of the Two Kingdoms,
 1988, The Rise and Growth of Dalit Movement; an Offshoot or Solution to the Age-Old Caste Problem of India,
 1989, Violence, non-violence,
 1989, The Concept of the Church. A Lutheran Perspective,
 1990, Justificação pela Fé e Missão num Contexto Multirreligioso e Multicultural (in Portuguese)
 2008, The Present Scenario of Christians vis-a-vis People of Other Faiths in India,

Honours
In 1999, Samuel W. Meshack, then a member of faculty at the Gurukul Lutheran Theological College, Chennai edited a festschrift in honour of Jesudoss marking the completion of his sixtieth year.  The festschrift was entitled Building God's Kingdom on Earth, Writings in Honour of D.W. Jesudoss on His Shastiapthapoorthi.

Further reading

References
Notes

University of Erlangen-Nuremberg alumni
Senate of Serampore College (University) alumni
1939 births
Living people
Scholars from Chennai
Indian lecturers
Indian Christian theologians
Indian Lutheran theologians
20th-century Indian translators
Academic staff of the Senate of Serampore College (University)